Yvonne Ruwaida (born 14 August 1970 in Göttingen, Lower Saxony, Germany) is a Swedish Green Party politician of Palestinian origin. She was a member of the Parliament of Sweden from 1994 to 2006.

As a member of parliament, Ruwaida together with Mariam Osman Sherifay (Social democrats) invited two representatives of the palestinian organization Hamas, which at the time was categorized as a terrorist organization by the EU. The invitees were a group leader in the palestine parliament and a relative of a Hamas leader which had been killed.

From 2006 until 2010, she was the leader of the Greens in the city council in Stockholm Municipality, where they were part of the opposition. Since then, she is vice-convener of the Green Party's central directorate.

According to terror scholar Magnus Ranstorp, Ruwaida is opposed to strengthening the anti-terror legislation in Sweden.

References

External links
Yvonne Ruwaida at the Riksdag website

1970 births
21st-century Swedish women politicians
Living people
Members of the Riksdag 1994–1998
Members of the Riksdag 1998–2002
Members of the Riksdag 2002–2006
Members of the Riksdag from the Green Party
Swedish people of Palestinian descent
Women members of the Riksdag